Charlotte Stewart (born February 27, 1941) is an American film and television actress.

Biography
Stewart is most famous for her role as the school teacher Miss Beadle on Little House on the Prairie and her work with director David Lynch.

Stewart graduated from the Pasadena Playhouse. Her first acting job was in the 1960 episode "The Glass Cage" on The Loretta Young Show. She has guest-starred on many television series ranging from Bonanza to The Office and the recurring role of Betty Briggs on Twin Peaks. She was also a prolific TV commercial actress. Her notable film appearances include Eraserhead and Tremors. In 1961, she met her first husband, Tim Considine, when she played Agnes Finley in the season-one episode "Deadline" of My Three Sons.

In 2016, Stewart self-published her memoirs in a book entitled Little House in the Hollywood Hills.

Filmography

Film

Television

References

External links
 
 
Bad Beadle: Charlotte Stewart Reveals Life of Sex, Drugs and Booze After 'Little House on the Prairie'
Litttle House on the Prairie: Miss Beadle and Me

People from Yuba City, California
1941 births
Living people
American television actresses
American film actresses
20th-century American actresses
21st-century American actresses
Writers from California
Considine family